Jon S. Fossel (born February 7, 1942) is an American politician who served in the New York State Assembly from the 93rd district from 1979 to 1982. He ran for New York's 20th congressional district in the 1982 election. He lost to Richard Ottinger.

References

1942 births
Living people
20th-century American politicians
Republican Party members of the New York State Assembly
Politicians from New York City